The Rona Jaffe Foundation Writers' Award was an award given annually to beginning women writers.  Established in 1995 by American author Rona Jaffe, the Foundation offers grants to writers of poetry, fiction, and creative nonfiction. The award was discontinued in March 2021; the foundation cited the high cost of administering the award as the main factor.

Recipients of the award were selected through nominations only.  Past recipients include Aryn Kyle, Emily Rapp, and ZZ Packer.

Winners

References

American poetry awards
Awards established in 1995
American fiction awards
American non-fiction literary awards
1995 establishments in the United States